The 2021 SPAR Challenge is the sixth edition of the netball Challenge Tournament organised by Netball South Africa. The series is being contested by three South African teams (the senior national team, the national "B" team known as the President's XII, and the under-21 team known as the Baby Proteas), the Ugandan national team, and the Namibian national team. The tournament was originally scheduled to occur in January 2021, though was postponed to March due to a resurgence of COVID-19 cases in South Africa. The tournament is sponsored by SPAR, is broadcast by SuperSport and will be held at the Cape Town International Convention Centre.

Squads

 Note: South African netballers playing in the United Kingdom, Australia and New Zealand domestic leagues were unavailable for the tournament.

Matches
 Source: Click here

25 March

26 March

27 March

28 March

29 March

30 March

31 March

Standings

References

External links
 Netball South Africa
 Netball Scoop Series Overview

2021 in netball
2021 in South African women's sport
Sports competitions in Cape Town
International netball competitions hosted by South Africa
2020s in Cape Town
Sports events postponed due to the COVID-19 pandemic
March 2021 sports events in South Africa